César Ferreras (born 6 May 1934) is a Venezuelan wrestler. He competed in the men's freestyle light heavyweight at the 1960 Summer Olympics.

References

External links
 

1934 births
Living people
Venezuelan male sport wrestlers
Olympic wrestlers of Venezuela
Wrestlers at the 1960 Summer Olympics
People from Bolívar (state)
Pan American Games medalists in wrestling
Pan American Games silver medalists for Venezuela
Pan American Games bronze medalists for Venezuela
Wrestlers at the 1959 Pan American Games
Wrestlers at the 1963 Pan American Games
20th-century Venezuelan people
21st-century Venezuelan people